Bobby Thomas (September 7, 1912 – November 12, 2008) was an American cyclist from Kenosha, Wisconsin. He competed in the sprint event at the 1932 Summer Olympics. In 1938 he won the Six Days of Buffalo.

References

External links
 

1912 births
2008 deaths
American male cyclists
Olympic cyclists of the United States
Cyclists at the 1932 Summer Olympics
Sportspeople from Kenosha, Wisconsin